The 2017 partypoker Mosconi Cup, the 24th edition of the annual nine-ball pool competition between teams representing Europe and the United States, took place 4–7 December 2017 at the Mandalay Bay in Las Vegas, Nevada.

Teams

Results

Monday, 4 December
Day review:

Tuesday, 5 December
Day review:

Wednesday, 6 December
Day review:

Thursday, 7 December
Day review:

References

External links
 Official homepage

2017
2017 in cue sports
2017 in sports in Nevada
Sports competitions in Las Vegas
December 2017 sports events in the United States
Mosconi Cup 2017